Group D of the men's football tournament at the 2020 Summer Olympics was played from 22 to 28 July 2021 in Rifu's Miyagi Stadium, Saitama's Saitama Stadium and Yokohama's International Stadium Yokohama. The group consisted of defending gold medalists Brazil, Germany, Ivory Coast and Saudi Arabia. The top two teams, Brazil and Ivory Coast, advanced to the knockout stage.

Teams

Standings

In the quarter-finals,
The winners of Group D, Brazil, advanced to play the runners-up of Group C, Egypt.
The runners-up of Group D, Ivory Coast, advanced to play the winners of Group C, Spain.

Matches

Ivory Coast vs Saudi Arabia

Brazil vs Germany

Brazil vs Ivory Coast

Saudi Arabia vs Germany

Saudi Arabia vs Brazil

Germany vs Ivory Coast

Discipline
Fair play points would have been used as a tiebreaker if the overall and head-to-head records of teams were tied. These were calculated based on yellow and red cards received in all group matches as follows:
first yellow card: minus 1 point;
indirect red card (second yellow card): minus 3 points;
direct red card: minus 4 points;
yellow card and direct red card: minus 5 points;

Only one of the above deductions is applied to a player in a single match.

References

External links
Men's Olympic Football Tournament Tokyo 2020, FIFA.com

Group D